Rio del Mar is a Philippine television drama series broadcast by GMA Network. Directed by Mel Chionglo, Jeffrey Jeturian and Gina Alajar, it stars Vivian Velez. It premiered on February 15, 1999. The series concluded on March 9, 2001 with a total of 541 episodes. It was replaced by Biglang Sibol, Bayang Impasibol in its timeslot.

Cast and characters

Lead cast
 Vivian Velez as Bianca

Supporting cast
 Michael de Mesa as Anton
 Celia Rodriguez as Candida
 Krista Ranillo as Giselle
 Melisse "Mumay" Santiago as Stefany
 Aiza Seguerra as Anna
 Cogie Domingo as Gerald
 Jhong Hilario as Rodel
 AJ Eigenmann as Jon-Jon
 Stella Ruiz as Eloisa
 Menggie Cobarubias as Pio
 Arisa Azakawa as Lizelle

Guest cast
 Ronaldo Valdez as Conrado
 Dennis Roldan as Miguel Bautista
 Julio Diaz
 Sharmaine Arnaiz
 Val Sotto
 Daisy Reyes
 Nina Medina

References

External links
 

1999 Philippine television series debuts
2001 Philippine television series endings
Filipino-language television shows
GMA Network drama series
Television series by TAPE Inc.
Television shows set in the Philippines